KBYG (1400 AM, "Big 1400 AM") is a radio station broadcasting a classic hits music format. Licensed to Big Spring, in the U.S. state of Texas, the station serves the Big Spring-Snyder area. The station is currently owned by Weeks Broadcasting, Inc. and features programming from Citadel Media.

History
KBYG began operation in 1948 as a 100–watt full-time operation. It increased to 1,000 watts days in 1964 and 1,000 watts nights in 1984. It was owned by the Grady Maples/RB McAlister interests in the late fifties, the John Hicks (father of Tom Hicks and Steven Hicks) interests in the sixties and seventies, Dick Fields interests in the eighties, and Drew Ballard in the nineties and 2000s.

KBYG is repeated on FM translator station K292FE, Big Spring, Texas.

Dick Fields was the owner of KBYG in the 1980s.  Dick Oppenheimer was the owner of crosstown KHEM/KWKI during the same period.

References

External links

BYG
Classic hits radio stations in the United States